"You Give Good Love" is the debut solo single by American singer Whitney Houston for her 1985 eponymous debut studio album. It was written by La Forrest 'La La' Cope and produced by Kashif. When La La sent Kashif a copy of the song, originally offered to Roberta Flack, she thought it would be a better fit for Houston and told Arista Records he would be interested in recording with her.

The song was released on February 22, 1985 as the album's lead single. The release of "You Give Good Love" was designed to give Houston a noticeable position and standing within the black music market first, which topped the US Billboard Hot Black Singles chart. However, it also made an unexpected crossover pop hit, peaking at number three on the Billboard Hot 100 chart, her first of what would be many Top 10 hits. It was later certified gold by the Recording Industry Association of America (RIAA). The single was released officially in some countries such as Australia, Canada, Japan, New Zealand and United Kingdom, but failed to make the top 40 in the countries except Canada, where it reached the top ten. The song won Favorite Soul/R&B Single at the 13th American Music Awards, and was nominated for Best R&B Song and Best Female R&B Vocal Performance at the 28th Grammy Awards in 1986.

The music video for the song directed by Karen Bellone, shows Houston performing at a club and a photographer focusing his camera on her. Houston performed the song on various TV shows and awards ceremonies such as The Tonight Show Starring Johnny Carson, The 1985 R&B Countdown and The 1st Soul Train Music Awards of 1987, as well as on her first three tours and select dates of The Bodyguard World Tour (1993–94) and My Love Is Your Love World Tour (1999). "You Give Good Love" is also featured on three of Houston's compilation albums, Whitney: The Greatest Hits (2000), Love, Whitney (2001) and The Essential Whitney Houston (2011).

Background 
When songwriter/producer Kashif accepted Arista president Clive Davis' invitation to see a New York club performance by a young singer named Whitney Houston that he'd just signed to the label, he was disappointed. Her act was a lounge act and didn't appeal to Kashif. Davis continued to court Kashif sending him a videotape of Houston's performance on The Merv Griffin Show. La La, a writer signed to Kashif's music publishing company, sent him a demo of a ballad she had written titled "You Give Good Love." She'd sent it to her idol Roberta Flack first but she was rebuffed by her assistant with an angry "don't call us, we'll call you" retort. When Kashif heard the song, a light bulb came out in his mind that flashed "hit! hit!" Then he called Gerry Griffith, an Arista A&R man, and said that "I think I have a song for you." So Griffith and Houston drove to the New Jersey studio where Kashif was working to check it out. Griffith recalled that there was a demo of the song but La La wanted to sing it live with her piano playing. After La La finished the song, Griffith said "that's the song – that's what I've been looking for." It was the kind of tune that had the emotion that she could get into and sing her heart out. The release of "You Give Good Love" was designed to give Houston a noticeable position and standing within the black music charts. Clive Davis later explained the thinking behind releasing the song as the debut single from the album:
"We wanted to establish her in the black marketplace first, otherwise you can fall between cracks, where Top 40 won't play you and R&B won't consider you their own. We felt that 'You Give Good Love' would be, at the very least, a major black hit, though we didn't think that it would cross over as strongly as it did. When it did cross over with such velocity that gave us great encouragement."

Lyrics controversy 
"You Give Good Love" brought Houston a bit of notoriety when it turned up among several songs cited by advice columnist Ann Landers as having suggestive titles. Landers, in her column for a reader who worried about the bad influence of song lyrics on children, wrote that "Some of the lyrics are sexually provocative. The titles tell the story," and called the song "pretty trashy stuff", citing the song's title as an instance along with "Hot Love" by Cheap Trick, "Let's Go to Bed" by The Cure, "Ready, Willing and Able" by Lita Ford, "You Shook Me All Night Long" and "Love at First Feel" by AC/DC, "Tease Me" by Junie Morrison, and "Fire Down Below" by Bob Seger.

Houston, in an interview with the Chicago Tribune, gave some answers to Landers's comments, saying "She chose a few songs out of the Top 40 that she thought had suggestive titles as far as she was concerned, and it was one of them. I don't think that the title is suggestive at all. It didn't say anything but 'you give good love,' and it didn't say anything in the song that was sexual or outrageous. I think that Miss Landers just looked at the title and didn't view the song itself."

Houston, who described herself as a religious person, said that she hasn't given much thought to the controversy over questionable lyrics:
"The songs that I sing don't fall into that category, so I don't think about it at all. But I believe that music does influence people. It's a universal thing. Everybody listens to music and knows about it. I think that the lyrics can have a lot to do with influencing whoever you're singing to. I think that as far as children are concerned, parents should have control over what they listen to. If they don't want them to listen to records that are very sexual or explicit or outrageous, they should have control over that situation. As for adults, they're going to buy whatever kind of music they want to hear, so if they buy music with explicit lyrics, they must like it."

Critical reception 
Billboard, in its review of the single, called Houston's vocal on the song as "a voice of exceptional clarity and control." Adam White, a performance reviewer of Billboard, in his writing of Houston's performance to promote her debut album at the Sweetwater's in New York, described the song as "the mellifluous, midtempo item." Other critic of Billboard, Brian Chin commented that "the ecstatic single which may possibly be the classiest make-out song since 'Fire and Desire'." While reviewing Houston's I Look to You album, Rashod D. Ollison from TheGrio.com stated that "You Give Good Love" is "effortlessly sexy."

Awards and nominations 
The song received a number of awards and nominations following its release. "You Give Good Love" won Favorite Soul/R&B Singles  at the 13th annual American Music Awards, where Houston garnered a total of six nominations in Pop/Rock and Soul/R&B categories, on January 27, 1986. The song received two Grammy nominations―Best R&B Song and Best R&B Vocal Performance, Female―but lost to "Freeway of Love" written by Jeffrey Cohen and Narada Michael Walden, performed by Aretha Franklin in both categories, at the 28th Grammy Awards, held on February 25, 1986.

Chart performance 
"You Give Good Love" entered the Billboard Hot Black Singles chart (later Hot R&B/Hip-Hop Songs) at number 89 on the March 9 issue, and on ninth week of its release, reached the top ten of the chart, the issue dated May 4, 1985. Eventually, it hit the pole position of the chart, the issue date of May 25, 1985, and stayed atop for one week, becoming Houston's first R&B number-one single. The song debuted at number 67 and number 40 on the Billboard Hot 100 Singles and Hot Adult Contemporary charts, respectively, on the May 11 issue. Eight weeks later the single reached the top ten on the Hot 100 chart, and in the following three weeks peaked at number three on the chart, the issue dated July 27, 1985, spending a total of 21 weeks on the chart. On the Adult Contemporary chart, it reached a peak of number four in the July 20, 1985 issue. It was ranked number 47 and number two on the Billboard year-end Top Pop Singles and Top Black Singles charts, respectively. The single was certified Gold for shipments of 1,000,000 copies in the United States alone by the Recording Industry Association of America (RIAA) on December 6, 1995. In Canada, the song debuted at number 95 on the RPM 100 Singles chart on the May 18 issue, and 14 weeks later peaked at number nine on the chart, the issue date of August 24, 1985. It placed at number 76 on the RPM year-end Top 100 Singles chart of 1985.

Worldwide, "You Give Good Love" was not released as a single except in a few countries such as Australia, Japan, New Zealand and the United Kingdom. Unlike in North America, the song did not receive enough attention to establish itself as a hit song in these markets, because other songs from Houston's debut album―"All at Once" and "Saving All My Love for You"―got a better reaction from the public and the media, particularly in Europe. The early promotion for the album was also strategically focused on these songs. The single entered, but did not reach the Top 40 of, the singles charts of several of these countries: it peaked at number 58 in Australia, 44 in New Zealand, and 93 in the UK.

Music video 

The music video for "You Give Good Love" was directed by Michael Lindsay-Hogg and produced by Karen Bellone, featured an off-duty cameraman entering a club that's being refurbished. Houston is on the stage rehearsing for a performance. Taken aback by her impressive singing, the man begins filming Houston as she performs. TIME commented that the video "tells the story of a romance with a cameraman ― and, more tellingly, with his adoring camera." Liam Lacey of The Globe and Mail, in an interview with Houston, called it "the blatantly erotic video" and added "Houston and a photographer have a suggestive encounter (the photographer with his zoom lens, the singer with her microphone)." Robyn Crawford, Houston's best friend and personal assistant, makes an appearance as one of the backing singers.

Live performances 
As a solo artist, Houston first promoted "You Give Good Love" alongside other tunes from her debut album Whitney Houston in the shows, arranged by Clive Davis for music critics to see Houston perform, at Sweetwater's club in New York, the place where Cissy Houston had been bringing Whitney along, on February 12–16, 1985. She also performed the song on The Tonight Show Starring Johnny Carson on April 5, 1985, which was her first National TV appearance since The Merv Griffin Show in 1983. This performance was included in the 2014 CD/DVD release, Whitney Houston Live: Her Greatest Performances.  Houston lip-synced to the album version of the song on the syndicated TV special "The 1985 R&B Countdown" which aired on December 31, 1985. She delivered a performance of "You Give Good Love" on the 1st Soul Train Music Awards, where Houston was nominated for two categories, at the Santa Monica Civic Auditorium on March 23, 1987. The performance is found in the bonus DVD featured on Whitney Houston: The Deluxe Anniversary Edition, remastered to celebrate the 25th anniversary of its original release.

In addition to her numerous performances for the song in TV shows as well as award ceremonies, the song was included in setlist on Houston's first three tours, Greatest Love Tour (1986), Moment of Truth World Tour (1987–88) and Feels So Right Japan Tour (1990). Additionally, the song was performed on select dates of her The Bodyguard World Tour (1993–94) and My Love Is Your Love World Tour (1999). Among her tour performances of the song, the Yokohama Arena live footage on January 7, 1990, was taped and later broadcast on Japanese TV channel.

Live cover versions 
Monica performed "You Give Good Love" as part of a tribute to Houston, the recipient of the Quincy Jones Award in that year, along with Ronald Isley, Terry Ellis and Kenny Lattimore at The 12th Soul Train Music Awards held on February 27, 1998. Jennifer Hudson covered the song as one of the setlist during her first US tour with Robin Thicke in April – May, 2009. Karen Rodriguez, one of Top 13 finalists on the tenth season of American Idol,  auditioned on MySpace first and then in front of the judges in Los Angeles with the song in 2010.

Track listing and formats 

UK, AUS 12"Vinyl Maxi-Single
A "You Give Good Love" (Extended Version) – 4:55
B1 "Someone for Me"
B2 "Thinking About You"
AUS, Japan 7"Vinyl Single
A "You Give Good Love" – 4:33
B "Greatest Love of All" – 4:55

UK 7"Vinyl Single
A "You Give Good Love"
B "Thinking About You"
US 7"Vinyl Single
A "You Give Good Love" – 3:58
B "Greatest Love of All" – 4:55

Credits and personnel 
Credits adapted from the album Whitney Houston liner notes.

Whitney Houston – lead vocal
J. T. Lewis – drums
Yogi Lee – background vocals
Ira Siegel – guitar
Michael O'Reilly – mixing, engineer
Kashif – arrangements, producer

Charts and certifications

Weekly charts

Year-end charts

Certifications

See also 
List of number-one R&B singles of 1985 (U.S.)
Grammy Award for Best Female R&B Vocal Performance

References

Bibliography

Further reading 
 "Whitney Houston" article in Ashyia Henderson Contemporary Black Biography, Volume 28, Gale Group 2001 reproduced on Biography Resource Center Thomson Gale 2005
 "Whitney Houston" article in Contemporary Newsmakers 1986, Gale Research 1987 published on Biography Resource Center Thomson Gale 2005

External links 
"You Give Good Love" music video at MTV.com
"You Give Good Love" lyrics at Rhapsody.com

1985 singles
Whitney Houston songs
Soul ballads
Contemporary R&B ballads
1984 songs
Arista Records singles
1980s ballads
Music videos directed by Michael Lindsay-Hogg
Songs written by La Forrest 'La La' Cope
Quiet storm songs